Trudi Ann Schmidt (born December 7, 1938) is an American politician and educator who served as a member of both chambers of the Montana Legislature.

Early life and education 
Schmidt was born in Butte, Montana. She earned a Bachelor of Science and Master of Science from the University of Montana.

Career 
Schmidt began her career as a high school teacher in Washougal, Washington before returning to Montana. She worked as a counselor and teacher at Great Falls High School and Great Falls College Montana State University.

Schmidt was elected to the Montana House of Representatives in 1996, representing the 42nd district from 1997 to 2003. From 2003 to 2005, Schmidt represented the 21st district in the Montana Senate. From 2007 to 2009, she represented the 11th district. In 2010, she returned to the Montana House to represent the 22nd district. She retired in 2013 and was succeeded by Casey Schreiner.

References

External links
Montana Senate - Trudi Schmidt
Project Vote Smart - Senator Trudi A, Schmidt (MT) profile
Trudi Schmidt campaign contributions - Follow the Money

Democratic Party Montana state senators
1938 births
Living people
Women state legislators in Montana
University of Montana alumni
21st-century American politicians
21st-century American women politicians